"Won't Go Home Without You" is a song by American band Maroon 5. It was released on November 19, 2007, as the third single from their second studio album It Won't Be Soon Before Long (2007).

Musical content
The guitar lines in the song are somewhat similar to The Police single "Every Breath You Take", which makes the moment at the end of the music video where Levine is watching the female character somewhat coincidental.

During their It Won't Be Soon Before Long Tour, Levine used an audience call and response of the lead guitar part of the chorus as an introduction to the song.

Critical reception
Reviews for "Won't Go Home Without You" have been generally positive, although some were mixed. Music journalist Robert Christgau gave a positive review on the album as well as the song, saying "The devilishly memorable "Won't Go Home Without You" combines confidence with affection rather than macho." Channel 4 called the song "[the] musical equivalent of a dog's fart at the dinner table" and gave it just one star out of a possible ten. Digital Spy gave the song two stars out of five, calling the song's lyrics "as cold, functional and ruthlessly effective as a state-of-the-art refrigerator".

Chart performance
"Won't Go Home Without You" peaked at number 48 in the Billboard Hot 100. As of June 2014, the song has sold 1,647,000 copies in the US.

The song became the first Maroon 5 single to fail to chart in the UK top 40, only peaking at number 44 on the UK Singles Chart.

Music video
On August 16, 2007, Maroon 5 posted a notice on their official website asking for fans to send in homemade videos to help the band make the video for this song; however, in October 2007, another video was released in Europe and Australia.  The official video was directed by Sophie Muller and premiered on VH1 Top 20 Video Countdown on December 1, 2007. 

The song's music video starts with flashbacks where Adam Levine (Maroon 5's lead singer) and a female character (portrayed by Tania Raymonde) appear to have an argument upon which Levine decides to leave. The video then cuts to Levine sitting in a chair thinking it over with the rest of the band performing in the background. Adam realizes that he 'will not go home without you', referring to the female he had walked out on. Levine appears to know where the woman is at the moment and decides to look for her. After having meandered through the city for a few hours - including bumping into a Chinese lion puppet - Levine eventually gets to a restaurant where he finds the woman, but to his disappointment, she is with another man.

This video features Jesse Carmichael playing both piano and guitar.

Awards and nominations

Track listings

Charts and certifications

Weekly charts

Year-end charts

Certifications

Release history

References

2007 singles
Maroon 5 songs
Music videos directed by Sophie Muller
Songs written by Adam Levine
Song recordings produced by Mike Elizondo
Rock ballads
2007 songs
A&M Octone Records singles
Torch songs
2000s ballads
Songs about loneliness
2008 singles